The Sanctuary of the Santissima Annunziata is a Baroque-style, Roman Catholic church located in the town of Chieri, in the Metropolitan City of Turin, region of Piedmont, Italy.

History 
The church was commissioned in 1650 by Duchess Maria Cristina of France from the architect Andrea Costaguta. It was built at the site of a  prior small chapel, where tradition holds, a mute was miraculously restored to the ability to speak after praying to a frescoed Madonna. This fresco is now found inside the church. In the chapel to the left is a copy of the painting of St Michael by Guido Reni, in the chapel on the right is an Adoration by the Magi by Giovanni Claret.

References 

17th-century Roman Catholic church buildings in Italy
Roman Catholic churches in Chieri
Baroque church buildings in Piedmont